Terence Walker (29 November 1921 – 4 October 1987) was an English professional footballer who played as an inside forward in the Football League for York City, and in non-League football for Selby Town and Goole Town.

References

1921 births
1987 deaths
Footballers from York
English footballers
Association football forwards
Selby Town F.C. players
York City F.C. players
Goole Town F.C. players
English Football League players